Just Dance Now is a video game in the Just Dance series developed and published by Ubisoft. It was released on September 25, 2014, in both the App Store and Google Play. The trailer for the game was revealed at E3 2014 on June 9, 2014 as a spin-off title. Without the purchase of a VIP pass, a free version of the game with limited plays is available.

Gameplay 
Just Dance Now is intended for people who may not have access to a console to play the original games. As with the original games, players must mimic the on-screen dancer's choreography to a chosen song. The app version uses an internet connection to the Just Dance Now website through either a television, a computer, a laptop, a tablet, a Chromecast or an Apple TV. The device acts as a motion controller, much like the Wii Remote. Multiple players may connect simultaneously, and there is no limit to the number of players allowed.

Since the June 2017 update, the game now allows players to play any song of their choosing for in-game currency instead of the previous model of providing a playlist offering limited free songs. The app offers a library of songs requiring a time-limit VIP pass which can be purchased through the app or coins which are automatically earned overtime or purchased through the app.

Track listing

Main series 
The following list contains the songs that had previously appeared in the main Just Dance series up until Just Dance 2022:

Note: All songs are playable by Mojo coins, however, spending coins will only play it once for 100 Mojo coins. The limit is 200 Mojo coins (2 plays) with a 24 hour cooldown after using it.

 A "*" indicates that the song is a cover version, not the original.
 parentheses in the Artist column indicate the cover artist or the actual credit of the song.
 An "(R)" indicates that the routine for the song has been remade, and differs from the original design from its debut.
 A "♀*" or "♂*" indicates that the dancer is a returning dancer.

Kids 
The following list contains songs that had previously appeared in the Kids Mode of Just Dance 2018 and Just Dance 2019, and from the Just Dance Kids series:

Note: All songs are playable by Mojo coins, however, spending coins will only play it once.

 A "*" indicates that the song is a cover version, not the original.
 parentheses in the Artist column indicate the cover artist or the actual credit of the song.
 A smaller gender symbol (♀ or ♂) indicates a backup dancer on screen that is unplayable.

ABBA: You Can Dance 
The following list are songs by ABBA that had previously appeared in the series' spin-off game, ABBA: You Can Dance:

Note: All songs are playable by Mojo coins, however, spending coins will only play it once.

Alternate modes

Alternate routines

Community content 

Note: All alternate and community content songs are playable by Mojo coins, however, spending coins will only play it once.

 A "*" indicates that the song is a cover version, not the original.
 parentheses in the Artist column indicate the cover artist of the song.
 A smaller gender symbol (♀ or ♂) indicates a backup dancer on screen that is unplayable.

Removed songs

Original routines

Community content

References

External links 
Official website

Dance video games
Android (operating system) games
IOS games
Fitness games
Just Dance (video game series)
Music video games
Ubisoft games
Video games developed in Italy
Video games developed in Sweden
Multiplayer and single-player video games
2014 video games